Helen Marlais is a professional pianist and an exclusive writer for the FJH Music Company Inc. She has also been an editor for the following award-winning piano series, Succeeding with the Masters, The Festival Collection, In Recital, Sight Reading and Rhythm Every Day, and The FJH Contemporary Keyboard Editions. Marlais has given pedagogical workshops in virtually every state in America and is an FJH showcase presenter at the National Piano Teachers' conventions.

As well as being the Director of Keyboard Publications for the FJH Music Company, Marlais is also an Associate Professor of Music at Grand Valley State University in Grand Rapids, Michigan, where she teaches piano performance majors, directs the piano pedagogy program, and coordinates the young beginner piano program. She also maintains an active piano studio of beginner through high school age award-winning students.

Marlais has given collaborative recitals throughout the US and in Canada, Italy, England, France, Hungary, Turkey, Germany, Lithuania, Estonia, China and Australia, and has premiered many new works by contemporary composers from the United States, Canada, and Europe. She has performed with members of the Chicago, Pittsburgh, Minnesota, Grand Rapids, Des Moines, Cedar Rapids, and Beijing National Symphony Orchestras and has recorded on Gasparo, Centaur and Audite record labels with her husband, concert clarinetist Arthur Campbell. She has also recorded numerous educational piano CDs on Stargrass Records.

Education
Marlais received her DM in piano performance and pedagogy from Northwestern University and her MFA in piano performance from Carnegie Mellon University.

External links
http://www.helenmarlais.com/biography.htm
http://www.fjhmusic.com/composer/hmarlais.htm

American classical pianists
American women classical pianists
Living people
21st-century classical pianists
21st-century American women pianists
21st-century American pianists
Year of birth missing (living people)